Saidabad (also Romanized as Sa‘īdābād; also known as Sa‘īdābād-e Sohrān) is a village in Nakhlestan Rural District, in the Central District of Kahnuj County, Kerman Province, Iran. At the 2006 census, its population was 393, in 78 families.

References 

Populated places in Kahnuj County